Ruth Allyn Marcus (born May 15, 1958) is an American political commentator and journalist who currently writes an op-ed column for The Washington Post and serves as the Deputy Editorial Page Editor for the newspaper. In March 2007, she was a finalist for the Pulitzer Prize for Commentary.  Unusual among the majority of journalists, she is also a law school graduate, although she opted to continue with a career in journalism versus practicing law as an attorney. Ideologically and politically, she identifies as a liberal and is registered as an Independent.

Biography

Background and education
Marcus was born in Philadelphia in 1958 and grew up in a Jewish family in Livingston, New Jersey. Both her parents were pharmacists. She attended school in Livingston with and has remained a close friend of fellow columnist Mona Charen. She studied at Yale University where she wrote for the college newspaper.

Career

Harvard Law School
After receiving her Yale B.A. degree, Marcus wrote for the National Law Journal, before attending Harvard Law School, from which she received her J.D. degree 
in 1984.

The Washington Post
Marcus began writing for The Washington Post while still in law school, and formally joined the paper after graduation.

From her Washington Post biography:

Marcus has been with The Post since 1984. She joined the national staff in 1986, covering campaign finance, the Justice Department, the Supreme Court and the White House. From 1999 through 2002, she served as deputy national editor, supervising reporters who covered money and politics, Congress, the Supreme Court, and other national issues. She joined the editorial board in 2003 and began writing a regular column in 2006.

Works
 Supreme Ambition: Brett Kavanaugh and the Conservative Takeover, Simon & Schuster (December 3, 2019)

Personal life
Marcus is married to former Federal Trade Commission Chairman Jon Leibowitz, a Democrat. The couple have two daughters, Emma and Julia.

References

External links
Ruth Marcus at The Washington Post

C-SPAN Q&A interview with Marcus and Mona Charen, July 9, 2006
C-SPAN Q&A interview with Marcus and Mona Charen, April 12, 2009

1958 births
Living people
20th-century American journalists
20th-century American women writers
21st-century American journalists
21st-century American women writers
American columnists
Harvard Law School alumni
Jewish American journalists
Journalists from New Jersey
Journalists from Pennsylvania
MSNBC people
NBC News people
People from Livingston, New Jersey
The Washington Post people
American women columnists
Yale University alumni